The Assistant Chief of the Naval Staff (Air) was a senior British Royal Navy appointment. The post holder was part of the Admiralty Naval Staff and member of the Board of Admiralty from 1941 to 1946.

History
The post was created in January 1943 as a new office to relieve the Assistant Chief of Naval Staff of one of his responsibilities the post holder was a part of the Admiralty Naval Staff and member of the Board of Admiralty. The office holder was responsible for supervising the directors of a number of naval staff divisions originally the Air Warfare and Training Division and later the  Naval Air Warfare and Flying Training Division until April 1946 when the post was abolished.

Office Holders
Included:
 Rear-Admiral Reginald Portal, — (January 1943–November 1944)
 Rear-Admiral Lachlan Donald Mackintosh, — (November 1944–August 1945)
 Rear-Admiral Charles E. Lambe, — (August 1945–December 1946)

References

A